Rype Fjord (meaning 'Grouse Fjord') is a fjord in King Christian X Land, eastern Greenland.
This fjord is part of the Scoresby Sound system in the area of Sermersooq municipality.

Geography

This fjord is an offshoot of the Ofjord (Øfjord). At the confluence the Rype Fjord branches to the northwest off the northern shore of the Ofjord, while the Hare Fjord runs in a westerly direction and the Rode Fjord branches towards the south. The Eielson Glacier is at the fjord's head flowing from the west. The glacier tongue is about 25 kilometers NW of the mouth of the fjord. 

The fjord is only 2.9 km wide at the mouth, becoming broader towards the north until reaching a width of over 5 km.

See also
List of fjords of Greenland

References

External links

Rypefjord, Øfjord and Ittoqqortoormiit
The Eielson Glacier, a tidewater glacier in Rypefjord. East Greenland
Holocene glacimarine sedimentation, inner Scoresby Sund

Fjords of Greenland
Scoresby Sound